Paralichthys is a genus of large-tooth flounders. Most species are native to the coastal waters of the Americas, but P. olivaceus is from northeast Asia.

Species
There are currently almost 20 species in this genus:
 Paralichthys adspersus (Steindachner, 1867) (Fine flounder)
 Paralichthys aestuarius C. H. Gilbert & Scofield, 1898 (Cortez flounder)
 Paralichthys albigutta D. S. Jordan & C. H. Gilbert, 1882 (Gulf flounder)
 Paralichthys brasiliensis (Ranzani, 1842) (Brazilian flounder)
 Paralichthys californicus (Ayres, 1859) (California flounder)
 Paralichthys delfini Pequeño & Plaza, 1987
 Paralichthys dentatus (Linnaeus, 1766) (Summer flounder)
 Paralichthys fernandezianus Steindachner, 1903
 Paralichthys isosceles D. S. Jordan, 1891
 Paralichthys lethostigma D. S. Jordan & C. H. Gilbert, 1884 (Southern flounder)
 Paralichthys microps (Günther, 1881)
 Paralichthys olivaceus (Temminck & Schlegel, 1846) (Bastard halibut)
 Paralichthys orbignyanus (Valenciennes, 1839)
 Paralichthys patagonicus D. S. Jordan, 1889 (Patagonian flounder)
 Paralichthys squamilentus D. S. Jordan & C. H. Gilbert, 1882 (Broad flounder)
 Paralichthys triocellatus A. Miranda-Ribeiro, 1903
 Paralichthys tropicus Ginsburg, 1933 (Tropical flounder)
 Paralichthys woolmani D. S. Jordan & T. M. Williams, 1897 (Speckled flounder)

The American four-spot flounder Hippoglossina oblonga is sometimes placed in Paralichthys by some authorities but FishBase does not and that source is followed here.

References

Paralichthyidae
Marine fish genera
Taxa named by Charles Frédéric Girard